Vardan Mazalov (born on 14 October 1983) is a Russian former football forward.

External links
Profile at championat.ru 

1983 births
Living people
Russian footballers
Russia under-21 international footballers
FC Lada-Tolyatti players
PFC CSKA Moscow players
FC Anzhi Makhachkala players
FC SKA Rostov-on-Don players
Russian Premier League players
FC Khimki players
FC Rostov players
FC Salyut Belgorod players
FC Vityaz Podolsk players
Association football midfielders
FC SKA-Khabarovsk players
FC Spartak Nizhny Novgorod players